Ernő Szabó (June 30, 1900 – November 10, 1966) was a Hungarian film actor.

Partial filmography

 Dollárpapa (1956) - Leihner Rudolf, kereskedõ
 Tanár úr, kérem... (1956) - Antikvárius
 Professor Hannibal (1956) - Nyúl Béla
 Gerolsteini kaland (1957) - Árgus rendõrfönök
 Láz (1957) - Alexárd
 Bolond április (1957)
 Iron Flower (1958) - Fischer
 La belle et le tzigane (1958) - Rezeda
 Micsoda éjszaka! (1958) - Huffnágel Jenõ
 Razzia (1958)
 Don Juan legutolsó kalandja (1958)
 Felfelé a lejtön (1959) - Fõkönyvelõ
 Álmatlan évek (1959)
 Kard és kocka (1959) - Pöschl írnok
 Bogáncs (1959) - Oszkár
 Játék a szerelemmel (1959) - A méhészet igazgatója
 Szerelem csütörtök (1959)
 Pár lépés a határ (1959) - Schönfeld
 Virrad (1960)
 Három csillag (1960) - Színész
 Égrenyíló ablak (1960) - Festõ
 Két emelet boldogság (1960) - Varga, házmester
 Füre lépni szabad (1960) - Utas a vonaton
 Az arc nélküli város (1960) - Vészi
 Nem ér a nevem (1961)
 Jó utat, autóbusz (1961) - Patak Feri bácsi
 Házasságból elégséges (1962) - Körmendi, Árpi apja
 Áprilisi riadó (1962)
 Angyalok földje (1962) - Keresztes bácsi
 Fagyosszentek (1962)
 The Man of Gold (1962) - Ali Csorbadzsi
 Párbeszéd (1963) - Ezredes
 Fotó Háber (1963)
 Új Gilgames (1964) - Sonneborn, könyvárus
 Ha egyszer húsz év múlva (1964)

Bibliography
 Cunningham, John. Hungarian Cinema: From Coffee House to Multiplex. Wallflower Press, 2004.

External links

1900 births
1966 deaths
Hungarian male film actors
Actors from Košice
20th-century Hungarian male actors